Raththa Dhanam is a 1988 Indian Tamil language film, directed by Sivachandran and produced by himself and Lakshmi. The film stars Prabhu, Gautami, Sadhana, Lakshmi and Sivachandran. It was released on 10 September 1988. An interesting feature in this film is the names of Prabhu and his two friends are Chinnaya, Thangavelu and Shanmugam – Chinnaya being Prabhu's grandfather (Nadigar thilagam's father), Thangavelu and Shanmugam being Nadigar Thilagam's real life brothers.

Plot

Cast 

Prabhu
Gautami
Sadhana
Lakshmi
Sivachandran
Jai Ganesh
Delhi Ganesh
Y. Vijaya
Disco Shanthi
Nizhalgal Ravi
S. S. Chandran
Pandu
Chandrakanth
Sivaji Manohar (debut)
Chandrasekhar
Prathap K. Pothan

Soundtrack 
Soundtrack was composed by Gangai Amaran.

Reception 
N. Krishnaswamy of The Indian Express wrote, "Sivachandran has tried every trick in the book to keep his film going – some of them jell and some don't but a bagful of tricks do not a good film make". Jayamanmadhan of Kalki criticised the film for not being entertaining enough.

References

External links 
 

1980s Tamil-language films
1988 films
Films directed by Sivachandran
Films scored by Gangai Amaran